Gloria Bromell Tinubu (born February 22, 1953) is an applied economist, educator, and political figure. She served on the Atlanta City Council and as a member of the Georgia State Assembly, as well as running as a candidate for Mayor of Atlanta.

Early life and education
Gloria Bromell Tinubu was born in Brookgreen Gardens Georgetown County, South Carolina near Murrells Inlet, South Carolina. She is the seventh of eight children born to Beatrice and Charlie Bromell, who were determined that their children would receive the high school education they never had. When she was four, her family moved to her parents' hometown, Plantersville, located in Georgetown County, South Carolina. She graduated from Choppee High School in 1971. She was salutatorian and president of her graduating class. The first in her family to go to college, she attended the University of South Carolina in Columbia for her freshman year as a Herbert Lehman Scholar. She transferred to Howard University, where she earned a bachelor's degree in Fine Arts with honors in 1974. In 1976, she married Soji Tinubu, a Nigerian-born U.S. citizen who has a master's degree in civil engineering from Clemson University. They have four children and six grandchildren.

Academia
Bromell decided on graduate studies, becoming the first African-American woman to earn an MS in Agricultural Economics (December 1977) from Clemson University. Her master's thesis addressed the problems associated with clouded title property, known as "heirs property". Her study was the first scientific documentation and measurement of the problem in South Carolina. Her findings were published in Progressive Farmer Magazine (1978), carried by many local newspapers throughout the State, presented at the American Agricultural Economics Association's annual meeting, and submitted to the South Carolina Legislature. State Rep. Herbert Fielding submitted a bill to correct problems identified by Bromell Tinubu.

Briefly, freedmen after the American Civil War acquired parcels of property in coastal areas of the state, sometimes passing it on to heirs without much documentation. Parcels became divided with interests split among many heirs. Developers have sometimes persuaded an heir to seeka buyout of his or her share of the property ... Court action often followed to allow the individual to realize his or her share. Unfortunately, other family members were left out in the cold as the land was sold at sheriff's sales for pennies on the dollar. Through the years, millions of acres of heirs property have been lost by families that couldn't intervene.

In 2006 the state passed its first law to provide more protection to families owning heirs property and who want to keep the family interest in the property. They have been given 10 days to inform courts that they need more time to contact family members and have a chance to buy out the person wanting to sell, and 45 days to raise the purchase price. Commentators believe these time periods need to be lengthened, given the complexity of many cases.

Bromell Tinubu continued with graduate work at Clemson, in August 1986 becoming the first African American to earn a Ph.D. in Applied Economics there. Her Ph.D. dissertation studied the financial stability of South Carolina's public water systems.

She had started her college academic career as an assistant professor of economics in 1986 at Spelman College (Atlanta, Georgia); she became chair of the economics department and earned tenure as associate professor in 1992. Since her move to South Carolina, Bromell Tinubu has worked as a teaching associate in the College of Business Administration at Coastal Carolina University in Conway.

From 2001 to 2004, she was founder and CEO of Atlanta Cooperative Development Corporation, a community economic development corporation for the development of cooperative entities such as credit unions, cooperative housing and businesses. Beginning in July 2004, she served as the president of Barber–Scotia College, a historically black college in North Carolina.

Political career
Entering politics in Georgia, Bromell Tinubu was elected in 1993 to a four-year term on the Atlanta City Council representing Council District 12. She was appointed to the Georgia Board of Education by Governor Roy Barnes in 2000. She was later elected as a Democrat to the Georgia General Assembly (HD-60 Georgia General Assembly), where she served on its committees for intra-governmental relations, interstate cooperation, and small business/job creation. Previously she was a candidate for Atlanta mayor in 1997 and 2001. In 2021, she co-authored The Georgia Way: How to Win Elections with Ray McClendon, Steven Rosenfeld, and Mike Hersh.

2012 congressional campaign

Having joined the Democratic Party in South Carolina, in 2012 Bromell Tinubu ran for the Democratic nomination in the newly created 7th congressional district.

Having returned to South Carolina, she entered state politics. In 2012, she ran as a Democrat for Congress in South Carolina's newly established 7th congressional district against state representative Ted Vick and Myrtle Beach attorney Preston Brittain. Vick dropped out of the race prior to the primary. She had won the Democratic primary for the district seat with 73% of the votes. She is the first African-American woman in South Carolina to win her party's nomination for Congress.

The South Carolina Election Commission declared Bromell Tinubu as the primary winner, but a judge ruled that the votes cast for Vick had to be counted. That dropped her percentage of the vote total below the 50 percent threshold needed to win the primary. Two weeks later, she beat Brittain in a primary runoff with 73 percent of the vote. Brittain had the endorsement of key Democratic leaders, including U.S. Rep. Jim Clyburn and former Gov. Jim Hodges.

Bromell Tinubu lost the election to Republican Tom Rice; he carried 56 percent of the votes to her 44 percent.

2014 congressional campaign

In 2014, she ran against Rice again, but she lost by bigger margins than in 2012. Rice won with 60% or 102,576 votes; Bromell Tinubu had 40% and 68,412 votes.

2018 Gubernatorial Race 
See also: 2018 South Carolina Gubernatorial Election

In 2018, Tinubu was selected by Democratic Gubernatorial candidate Phil Noble to be his Lt. Governor running mate. James Smith ultimately won the Democratic Nomination

2019 United States Senate Race 
See also: 2020 United States Senate Elections

In May of 2019, Tinubu announced a run for United States Senate, challenging Republican incumbent Lindsey Graham. She campaigned on the theme, 'Reshaping America: Economic Justice Tour'.   Tinubu joined Democrat Jaime Harrison in competing for the nomination.  In January 2020, Tinubu dropped out of the race, endorsing Harrison.

References

External links
 Campaign site

1953 births
Living people
American women economists
American educators
Members of the Georgia House of Representatives
Women state legislators in Georgia (U.S. state)
African-American state legislators in Georgia (U.S. state)
African-American women in politics
Howard University alumni
Clemson University alumni
21st-century American politicians
21st-century American women politicians
People from Murrells Inlet, South Carolina
Economists from South Carolina
21st-century American economists
20th-century American economists
Candidates in the 2012 United States elections
South Carolina Democrats
Candidates in the 2014 United States elections
Candidates in the 2020 United States elections
20th-century African-American women
20th-century African-American people
21st-century African-American women
21st-century African-American politicians